Teodor Coman (born circa 1962) is a former Romanian rugby union football player. He played as a scrum-half.

Club career
At club level, he played for CSA Steaua București.

International career
Coman was first capped for Romania during the 1985-1987 FIRA Trophy, during the match against Spain in Madrid, on 16 December 1984. He was also called up for the Romania team at the 1987 Rugby World Cup, however, he did not play any match due to Mircea Paraschiv being the starter scrum-half during the tournament. Although he was not called up for the 1991 Rugby World Cup squad, he still played for Romania, with his last international cap being during the match against France on 28 May 1992 in Le Havre.

Honours

Team honours
Liga Națională de Rugby:
 CSA Steaua București:
Champion in 1979/80, 1980/81, 1982/83, 1983/84, 1984/85, 1986/87, 1987/88, 1988/89, 1991/92 ;
Runner up in 1985/86, 1989/90, 1992/93, 1994/95, 1997/98.
Romania
FIRA Trophy:
Third place in  1985-87, 1987-89 and 1990-92

Individual honours
Master of Sports of Romania in 1992

References

External links
 

1962 births
Living people
Romanian rugby union players
Romania international rugby union players
Rugby union scrum-halves